Charles E. Barnhart (January 9, 1922 – June 28, 2007) was an American attorney, politician, and engineer who served as the ex-officio mayor of Albuquerque from 1970 to 1971 and as a member of the Albuquerque City Commission from 1967 to 1971.

Early life and education 
Barnhart was born and raised in Santa Rosa, New Mexico, where he attended the Santa Rosa Public High School. He earned a Bachelor of Science degree in engineering from the University of New Mexico in 1944 and a Juris Doctor from the University of New Mexico School of Law.

Career 
During World War II, Barnhart was commissioned as an ensign in the United States Navy and served aboard the USS Waupaca. After the war, Barnhart worked as an engineer in Albuquerque and Los Alamos, New Mexico. After graduating from law school in 1959, he worked as an attorney in Albuquerque for several years. Barnhart was also the developer of the Van Cleave Mobile home park, a planned community for seniors.

Barnhart served as a member of the Albuquerque City Commission from 1967 to 1971 and chairman of the commission in 1970 to 1971, a rank equivalent to mayor.

Death 
Barnhart died in Albuquerque in 2007. He was 85.

References

New Mexico Republicans
1922 births
2007 deaths
20th-century American politicians
People from Santa Rosa, New Mexico
University of New Mexico alumni
University of New Mexico School of Law alumni
New Mexico lawyers
Engineers from New Mexico
20th-century American lawyers